The December 2009 Rawalpindi attack in Rawalpindi, Pakistan was a terrorist attack on a mosque during Friday prayers on 4 December 2009. The mosque is located near the Pakistan Army's headquarters in Rawalpindi, is surrounded by military houses and is frequented by retired and serving officers.

The attack on the mosque
Five armed suicide attackers opened fire on and hurled grenades at the crowd of about 150 worshipers, gathered for prayers in the mosque on Parade Lane. Security forces soon arrived on the scene to engage the terrorists; All five of the militants died by either blowing themselves up or fighting the soldiers inside the mosque. The area around the mosque was cordoned off and the security forces initiated a search for more attackers in the area. Helicopters were also used.

Approximately 37 people were killed instantly, while 61 others were injured, including women and children. The victims were mostly retired and serving officers. Eyewitnesses reported that the victims were fired upon at close range and the mosque was badly damaged in the attack. The roof of the mosque has collapsed. No group has claimed responsibility. An eyewitness reported the worshipers had to pass through "tight security", including metal detectors to enter the mosque. Senior police official Aslam Tarin suggested the attackers may have entered the mosque by scaling the mosque wall.

There is speculation that the attack was in retaliation for the Pakistan army's campaign into the Taliban stronghold of South Waziristan. Killed in the attack were nine army personnel including Major General Bilal Omer Khan, a brigadier, two lieutenant colonels and two majors; deputy director of NLC, Taskeen Anjum as well as many children belonging to the families of Army men such as Hashim Masood Aslam, the only son of Lt. Gen Masood Aslam who is the commander of XI Corps (Pakistan). General Muhammad Yusaf Khan former Chief of Army Staff (VCOAS) under Pervez Musharraf was injured in the attack.

Aftermath
Tehrik-i-Taliban Pakistan said that responsibility for the attack in an email sent to CNN and stated "We once again mention that we are not against the innocent people and the state of Pakistan but against those officers and ministers who are American by hearts and minds and Pakistani just by faces".

Muslim and Islamic viewpoint
After the attack, a Muslim engineering student and a friend of a victim stated, "These extremists are not Muslims, they are butchers", he further went on to say, "We need to give these people proper education, to turn them into human beings".

Pakistani Sufi scholar Tahir-ul-Qadri also condemned the attacks and said "Suicide attacks are not allowed in Islam, these actions are un-Islamic". He went on to say "The slaughter of human beings in any religion or country, and terrorism in all its manifestations, are totally in contradiction with the teachings of Islam." A view which is also held by mainstream (non-Sufi) Muslims and also stated in the Qur'an.

See also
List of terrorist incidents in Pakistan since 2001
List of terrorist incidents, 2009

References

21st-century mass murder in Pakistan
Mass murder in 2009
Terrorist incidents in Pakistan in 2009
Terrorist incidents in Rawalpindi
Suicide bombings in Pakistan
Mass shootings in Pakistan
Massacres in religious buildings and structures
Attacks on religious buildings and structures in Pakistan
Crime in Punjab, Pakistan
History of Rawalpindi
December 2009 events in Pakistan
2009 mass shootings in Asia
2009 murders in Pakistan
Attacks on religious buildings and structures
Attacks on mosques
Attacks on mosques in Asia
Mosque bombings
Mosque bombings in Asia